Carl Elias Milliken (July 13, 1877May 1, 1961) was an American politician, and business executive. He served as the 51st Governor of Maine, and was the Chief Spokesman for the Motion Picture Association of America.

Early life and education 
A native of Pittsfield, Maine, Milliken was the son of Charles Arthur Milliken and Phoebe Ellen Knowlton. Milliken graduated from Bates College in 1897. He went on to receive his master's degree from Harvard University in 1899, before moving to Island Falls, Maine to enter the lumber business.

Early business career 
During the next six years, Milliken held positions as general manager of two lumber companies and an axe manufacturer and as president of a local telephone company.

Political career 
His political career began in 1905, when he was elected to the Maine House of Representatives. Milliken moved up to the Maine State Senate in 1909, and was president of that body from 1913 to 1915.

As governor 
Running for Governor of Maine as a Republican Party candidate in 1916, Milliken easily defeated the Democratic Party incumbent, Oakley C. Curtis. He was reelected in 1918, this time by a smaller margin over Bertrand McIntire. As governor, he strictly enforced state and federal alcohol prohibition laws, which he strongly supported. Milliken lost renomination to Frederic Hale Parkhurst in the 1920 Republican primary.

Motion Picture career 
Milliken left office on January 5, 1921. The following year, he became executive secretary and chief spokesman of the Motion Picture Producers and Distributors Association (later the Motion Picture Association of America), the movie industry's first self-censorship body. Milliken served as executive secretary for more than two decades, retiring in 1947.

In retirement 
After stepping down from the MPAA, Milliken served as the managing trustee of Teaching Film Custodians, a trust for educational films, and also served a term as president of the American Baptist Foreign Missionary Society.

Personal life 
Milliken married twice. His first wife, the former Emma Chase, died in 1930. He then married her sister, Caroline Chase. With his first wife, Milliken had one son and six daughters. His first wife was the daughter of his alma mater's president George Colby Chase, while his second wife was Chase's other daughter.

References 

 "Ex-Gov. Milliken of Maine was 83." New York Times, 2 May 1961: 37.
 Senate Presidents - Maine Legislature - Carl E. Milliken

Republican Party governors of Maine
Bates College alumni
Harvard University alumni
People from Pittsfield, Maine
1877 births
1961 deaths
American media executives
Maine Progressives (1912)
People from Aroostook County, Maine
Republican Party members of the Maine House of Representatives
Republican Party Maine state senators